Parthi Bhatol was the ex-chairman of the Banaskantha Milk Producers' Union. He was ex-chairman of the Gujarat Cooperative Milk Marketing Federation (GCMMF). on 26 April 2006, replacing its founding chairman, Verghese Kurien.

References

Living people
Year of birth missing (living people)